Kim Perrot (January 18, 1967 – August 19, 1999) was an American basketball player. She played in the WNBA for the Houston Comets.

Biography
Perrot attended the University of Southwestern Louisiana (now the University of Louisiana at Lafayette) and played four years there as a guard. In one game against the University of Southeastern Louisiana, she scored 58 points, the third most in NCAA history.

After playing six seasons in Europe, Perrot became the regular point guard for the Houston Comets, helping them to win WNBA championships in 1997 and 1998. At 5 ft 5 in (1.65 m), she was noted there for her ferocious play and was a crowd favorite. Her best friend was Comets star Cynthia Cooper. Perrot wore jersey number 10 with the Comets organization, which subsequently retired her jersey. She averaged 7.2 points, 3.3 steals, and 2.9 rebounds per game during her two seasons as a member of the Comets. In her last regular season game with the Comets, exactly one year before her death, she scored ten points against the Los Angeles Sparks. In her last overall game, she scored 13 points in Game 3 of the 1998 WNBA Finals, helping Houston to its second straight title.

In February 1999, Perrot was diagnosed with lung cancer. While she was not on the basketball court with the Comets that year, many of her teammates considered her to be a spiritual uplifting force for the team.

The cancer had already metastasized to her brain. Perrot underwent surgery and radiation treatments to eradicate the tumors in her head, but declined chemotherapy recommended by her doctors. Perrot went to Mexico to seek alternative methods to battle cancer. Many attribute her death to that move—but metastasized lung cancer gave her no chance of survival with conventional medicine. In Mexico, she was joined by Cooper. Two days before her death, she took a Medevac flight back to Houston from Tijuana, with Cooper and members of the Perrot family flying along. She was the first active player in the WNBA to die.

After her death, the Comets went on to win a third straight WNBA title, and a tearful Cooper celebrated what the team called "#3 for #10". She was posthumously awarded a third championship ring and her #10 jersey was retired, thus making her the first player in league history to have her number retired. The WNBA subsequently renamed their sportsmanship award the Kim Perrot Sportsmanship Award in her honor.

Comets fans raised money to create "Kim's Place", an area at the MD Anderson Cancer Center in Houston where kids with cancer can play games, sports, and relax. Also, the "Kim Perrot Leadership Award" was created by the Houston Can! Academy (a charter school for at risk youth). While ill with cancer, Perrot had made many public appearances and given motivational speeches, mostly at schools.

Perrot is buried at the Our Lady of the Assumption Cemetery in Carencro, Louisiana.

Southwestern Louisiana statistics
Source

Career statistics

Regular season

|-
| style="text-align:left;background:#afe6ba;"|1997†
| style="text-align:left;"|Houston
| 28 || 24 || 24.7 || .364 || .283 || .405 || 2.7 || 3.1 || 2.5 || 0.1 || 2.3 || 5.8
|-
| style="text-align:left;background:#afe6ba;"|1998†
| style="text-align:left;"|Houston
| 30 || 30 || 32.9 || .404 || .269 || .700 || 3.1 || 4.7 || 2.8 || 0.0 || 2.7 || 8.5
|-
| style="text-align:left;"|Career
| style="text-align:left;"|2 years, 1 team
| 58 || 54 || 28.9 || .387 || .275 || .598 || 2.9 || 4.0 || 2.6 || 0.0 || 2.5  || 7.2

Playoffs

|-
| style="text-align:left;background:#afe6ba;"|1997†
| style="text-align:left;"|Houston
| 2 || 2 || 38.0 || .227 || .214 || .750 || 4.5 || 2.0 || 3.0 || 0.0 || 4.5 || 8.0
|-
| style="text-align:left;background:#afe6ba;"|1998†
| style="text-align:left;"|Houston
| 5 || 5 || 36.4 || .375 || .375 || .417 || 3.2 || 5.0 || 1.6 || 0.0 || 3.4 || 8.2
|-
| style="text-align:left;"|Career
| style="text-align:left;"|2 years, 1 team
| 7 || 7 || 36.9 || .323 || .300 || .500 || 3.6 || 4.1 || 2.0 || 0.0 || 3.7 || 8.1

See also
List of basketball players who died during their careers
List of notable brain tumor patients

References

External links

 

 

1967 births
1999 deaths
American expatriate basketball people in France
American expatriate basketball people in Germany
American expatriate basketball people in Israel
American expatriate basketball people in Sweden
American women's basketball players
Basketball players from Louisiana
Deaths from cancer in Texas
Deaths from lung cancer
Houston Comets players
Louisiana Ragin' Cajuns women's basketball players
Point guards
Undrafted Women's National Basketball Association players
20th-century American women
20th-century American people